This is a list of Israeli television related events from 1983.

Events
 Ofra Haza is selected to represent Israel at the 1983 Eurovision Song Contest with her song "Hi". She is selected to be the tenth Israeli Eurovision entry during Kdam Eurovision held at the Jerusalem Theatre in Jerusalem.

Debuts
7 February - Krovim Krovim (1983-1986)